Panathinaikos B.C., also known simply as Panathinaikos, is the professional basketball team of the major Athens-based multi-sport club Panathinaikos A.O. It is owned by the billionaire Giannakopoulos family.

The parent athletic club was founded in 1908, while the basketball team was created in 1919, being one of the oldest in Greece. Alongside Aris, they are the only un-relegated teams with participation in every Greek First Division Championship until today.

Panathinaikos has developed into the most successful basketball club in Greek basketball's history, and one of the most successful in European basketball, creating its own dynasty. They have won six EuroLeague Championships, thirty-nine Greek Basket League Championships, twenty Greek Cups, one Intercontinental Cup, one Greek Super Cup and two Triple Crowns. They also hold the record for most consecutive Greek League titles, as they are the only team to have won nine consecutive championships (2003–2011), as well as for the most consecutive Greek Basketball Cup titles, winning six from 2012 to 2017. Panathinaikos counts one more championship that took place in 1921 and was organized by the YMCA. It is however not recognized by the Hellenic Basketball Clubs Association, as it was before the creation of the Hellenic Basketball Federation. The team plays its home games in the O.A.C.A. Olympic Indoor Hall, which has a maximum capacity of 19,250 for basketball games. Panathinaikos also holds the world record for the longest title-winning streak, spanning 27 seasons, starting in 1995-96 and continuing up until today. These last 27 years, Panathinaikos have won at least one title each season and 43 titles overall.

Among the numerous well-known top class players who have played with the club over the years are Dominique Wilkins, Fragiskos Alvertis, Byron Scott, Nick Galis, John Salley, Dimitris Diamantidis, Antonio Davis, Stojko Vranković, Dino Rađja, Šarūnas Jasikevičius, Dejan Bodiroga, Oded Kattash, Ramūnas Šiškauskas, Panagiotis Giannakis, Fanis Christodoulou, Alexander Volkov, Marcelo Nicola, Hugo Sconochini, Željko Rebrača, Antonis Fotsis, İbrahim Kutluay, John Amaechi, Nikola Peković, Jaka Lakovič, Pepe Sánchez, Kostas Tsartsaris, Mike Batiste, Nick Calathes, Vassilis Spanoulis, Dejan Tomašević, Byron Dinkins, Ferdinando Gentile, Sani Bečirovič, Darryl Middleton, Lazaros Papadopoulos, Žarko Paspalj, Nikos Chatzivrettas, Dimos Dikoudis, Tiit Sokk, Sofoklis Schortsanitis, Jason Kapono, Arijan Komazec, Edgar Jones, Romain Sato, Johnny Rogers, Tony Delk, Drew Nicholas, Stéphane Lasme, Roko Ukić, Robertas Javtokas, Jonas Mačiulis, Ioannis Bourousis, James Gist, Keith Langford and Jimmer Fredette. Such players, the successful management of former long-time presidents Pavlos Giannakopoulos and Thanasis Giannakopoulos, as well as the long-time guidance of the most successful coach in EuroLeague history, Željko Obradović, turned Panathinaikos into the most successful team in Europe over the last two-and-a-half decades.

Panathinaikos is the only team on the European continent to win as many as six EuroLeague titles (1996, 2000, 2002, 2007, 2009, 2011), since the establishment of the modern era EuroLeague Final Four format in 1988 (no other club has won more than four EuroLeague championships in this period). They were also EuroLeague runners-up in 2001. They reached the EuroLeague Final Four eleven times altogether (1994, 1995, 1996, 2000, 2001, 2002, 2005, 2007, 2009, 2011, 2012).

History

Basketball in Greece (1918–1945) 

Panathinaikos started as a football club in 1908. In 1919, basketball was still unknown in Greece. During that period Giorgos Kalafatis with other athletes participated in the Inter-Allied Games in Paris and attended basketball games between the Allies of World War I. When he later returned to Greece with the necessary equipment, he set up the Panathinaikos basketball club, led by Apostolos Nikolaidis.

In 1919, PAO played their first match against X.A.N. Thessaloniki (YMCA), another club also pioneer of basketball in Greece, a match which took place at the Panathenaic Stadium.

In 1937, Kalafatis managed to create a new Panathinaikos team that, during the following year, tried to catch up with already established clubs like the YMCA, Ethnikos G.S. Athens, Panionios, Aris and Iraklis. Angelos Fillipou, Nikos Mantzaroglou, Litsas and Dimitrakos were the ringleaders of the group and were later joined by Telis Karagiorgos, Thymios Karadimos, Giorgos Bofilios, Philipos Papaikonomou, Petros Polycratis and Nikos Polycratis. During the German occupation that followed, Dimitris Giannatos (founding member of the basketball team) was executed by the Nazis for his resistance action.

Postwar history (1946–1970) 

In 1946 (the first post-war championship) and 1947, Panathinaikos emerged champions, with the help of players like Ioannis Lambrou, Missas Pantazopoulos, Stelios Arvanitis (these players would later go on to win the bronze medal in EuroBasket 1949) and Jack Nicolaidis (nephew of Apostolos Nikolaidis).

In 1950 and 1951, Panathinaikos emerged as champions once again with the help of great athletes Faidon Matthaiou (considered the Patriarch of Greek basketball) and Nikos Milas. In 1954, the club would repeat the success, however the next five years would prove fruitless, and the club, despite its strength, would have to be renewed.

In 1961, Panathinaikos won the Greek League championship with new leaders Georgios Vassilakopoulos, Stelios Tavoularis and Petros Panagiotarakos. In 1962, Panathinaikos made the repeat, and was again the Greek League champion. That was also the year that PAO took part for the first time in a European-wide competition, as they faced Hapoel Tel Aviv in the FIBA European Champions Cup 1961–62 season.

On 23 November 1963, Panathinaikos beat Olympiacos, by a score of 90–48, in the Mantellos Cup, a tournament that was later replaced by the Greek Cup, which made its first appearance in 1976.

In 1967, Panathinaikos were crowned Greek League champions, with Giorgos Kolokithas (one of the greatest basketball players of his era) in their ranks. In 1969, the conquest of the Greek League championship was followed by the first European success of the club, the qualification to the semifinals of the FIBA European Cup Winners' Cup 1968–69 season, where they were eliminated by Dinamo Tbilisi. The next year, 1970, PAO was the first Greek basketball team to use a foreign player (Craig Greenwood) in a European game.

The Golden Age (1970–1984) 
During these golden years, Panathinaikos won 10 out of 14 Greek League championships, with their great leader and scorer Apostolos Kontos.

During this period, Kostas Mourouzis, nicknamed the fox of coaching, managed the team of the 4-K (the young Kontos, Koroneos, Kokolakis and Kefalos). These players, along with Iordanidis, who functioned as a link with older players, won 5 consecutive Greek League championships, and made the greatest accomplishment of their time by participating in the semifinals of the FIBA European Champions Cup 1971–72 season, when they were aided by American Willy Kirkland. Unfortunately, Ignis Varese, one of the giants of the era, proved an insurmountable obstacle for Panathinaikos.

Over the next 4 seasons, Panathinaikos captured the Greek League championship once, in 1977, and also won their first Greek Cup in 1979. They acquired Memos Ioannou in 1974, and Greek-American David Stergakos in 1979 (a player that would contribute greatly to the team in the coming years).

In the five years that followed, Panathinaikos won 4 Greek League championships (1980, 1981, 1982, 1984) and two Greek Cups (1982, 1983). More specifically, in 1982, while coached by Kostas Politis, Panathinaikos succeeded in winning their first Greek double, as well as placing 6th in the FIBA European Champions Cup 1981–82 season. During that season's group stage, Panathinaikos finished ahead of a strong CSKA Moscow team, after winning in the last seconds of a thriller game. The club's last Greek League championship, before the club's decline that followed, was in 1984, when Panathinaikos won the big game title in Corfu, which Liveris Andritsos and Tom Kappos starring for the team.

Panathinaikos had a great chance to avoid their upcoming decline, when they discovered Rony Seikaly, but Greek government bureaucratic problems prevented him from playing in the Greek League as a Greek citizen, despite claims that he was entitled to do so, which ultimately forced him to move to the United States to play college basketball at Syracuse.

The decline of 1985–1992 

In 1985, PAO finished in 3rd place in the Greek League. Stergakos, Ioannou, Vidas, Andritsos and Koroneos – who left the following year – were the key players. The balance of the Greek League's power however, had tilted in favour of Aris, and Panathinaikos ceased to be the leader of the league, and were limited to a secondary role. Nevertheless, they remained a worthy adversary. Thus, in 1986, against all odds, they managed to eliminate powerful Aris from the Greek Cup at the semifinal stage. Then Panathinakos went on to beat Olympiacos in the final, and conquered what would be their last title until 1993. During the next 2 seasons, PAO would finish in 5th place In the Greek League (their worst results in many years).

In 1988, the ban on using foreign players in the Greek League was lifted, and Panathinaikos was able to acquire Edgar Jones, from the NBA. He was a capable shooter, scorer and rebounder, and for the next 2 years, he was the star of the team. Although PAO achieved significant wins over the other major Greek teams, they did not manage any notable distinctions. Over the next two years, Antonio Davis, who later made a great career in the NBA, replaced Jones, as the leader of the team. At this point in time, Panathinaikos had also acquired some of the most talented young Greek players (Fragiskos Alvertis, Nikos Oikonomou and Christos Myriounis), but that did not stop them from experiencing the worst period in the history of the club, as they finished 7th in the Greek League in 1991, and dropped to the 8th position in 1992, which left them outside of European-wide play for the first time since 1967.

Return to distinction (1992–1995) 

In 1992, the club's basketball department became professional, under the management of the Giannakopoulos family. In the summer of 1992, Panathinaikos attempted a full reconstruction of the team. Nikos Galis, the top Greek basketball player, was acquired by the club, and was flanked by star players Stojko Vranković, Tiit Sokk, and Arijan Komazec. Thus, Galis lead PAO to a Greek Cup win and also to the Greek League championship finals, where they lost despite having home court advantage. In the next season, 1993–94, Galis, along with Sasha Volkov and Stojko Vranković, led Panathinaikos to a 3rd-place finish at the 1994 FIBA European League Final Four, which was the highest finish in the club's history. Although they did not manage to win the title.

The 1994–95 season started with the best conditions, as the club acquired Panagiotis Giannakis and Žarko Paspalj. PAO was again the favourite for all domestic titles. The club started by eliminating Olympiacos from the Greek Cup in a very tough game, before the start of the Greek League championship. However, after the first games of the Greek League, Nikos Galis, the player that had led PAO in the Greek Cup game against Olympiacos, and also in the decisive game of the FIBA European League's 1994–95 season qualifiers, ended his professional basketball playing career. As a consequence, the team, despite playing some great games, only managed to retain the 3rd-place finish in Europe, and make the Greek League finals.

European, Intercontinental and Greek Champions (1996–1999) 

During the years 1996–98, Panathinaikos fulfilled all of their objectives by winning the FIBA European League championship, the FIBA Intercontinental Cup and the Greek League championship (in that order).

In 1996, the expectations of the team had risen a lot, as it was imperative for Panathinaikos to obtain a significant title. In the summer of 1995, they acquired the nine-time NBA All-Star, Dominique Wilkins, one of the top American players that ever played in Europe. The head coach of the team was Božidar Maljković. The former, along with Giannakis, Vranković, Alvertis, and Patavoukas, comprised a very experienced team, which, in 1996, managed an unprecedented success for Greek basketball. Indeed, in April 1996, at the Paris Final Four, Panathinaikos became the first Greek team to lift the FIBA European League championship (now called the EuroLeague), by beating Banca Catalana FC Barcelona in the tournament's final, by a score of 67–66. Back in Greece, right after the big win in Paris, Panathinaikos was not able to clinch the Greek League title, after again losing the title to Olympiacos.

In the next season, Maljković removed all the stars from the roster, in an attempt to assemble a squad based on teamwork. With the start of the season, Panathinaikos was crowned 1996 FIBA Intercontinental Cup champion, by prevailing by 2–1 wins in a 3-game series over Olimpia of Venado Tuerto, the South American League champions. Unfortunately, the restructuring of the team failed, and Panathinaikos failed to participate in the 1997 FIBA EuroLeague Final Four, in order to defend their European title. Moreover, they finished in 5th place in the Greek League championship, thus losing the right to participate in next season's EuroLeague.

In the next season, Slobodan Subotić assumed head coaching leadership of the club, and convinced Dino Rađja to come to Panathinaikos. The huge transfer of Radja was accompanied by three-time NBA champion Byron Scott and Fanis Christodoulou, and with the help of Alvertis, Oikonomou, and Koch, Panathinaikos finally won the Greek League again, after 14 years.

In the summer of 1998 Panathinaikos chairman Pavlos Giannakopoulos began assembling a team to conquer Europe. In order to achieve that, he signed the 1998 FIBA World Cup MVP, Dejan Bodiroga, while Nando Gentile, Pat Burke and Nikos Boudouris also joined the team. The 1998–99 season proved very important for Panathinaikos, as Olympiacos, who had gained home court advantage in the Greek League playoffs, were prepared to return to the top. It was at the last game of the Greek League finals, when Panathinaikos achieved one of the most decisive away victories against their rivals, capturing the title.

Obradović era (1999–2012) 

The arrival of Željko Obradović to Panathinaikos, during summer 1999, marked the beginning of an extraordinary period for the club, with many major successes, and the establishment of the team as one of the strongest in the history of European club basketball.

The first thing that Obradović did, was to adapt the team to Dejan Bodiroga, who was the absolute leader of Panathinaikos. As a result of the success of his strategy, PAO managed to capture 2 EuroLeague titles (2000, 2002,) after 3 consecutive EuroLeague Finals appearances (2000–2002), and also won 3 consecutive Greek League championships (1999–2001). In 2000, at the Thessaloniki EuroLeague Final Four, Panathinaikos became EuroLeague champions for the second time, after beating Macabbi Elite Tel Aviv, 73–67, in the final. In 2002, in Bologna, at the 2002 EuroLeague Final Four, Panathinaikos won the most prestigious European trophy for the third time, after beating hosts Kinder Bologna, by the score of 89–83, in the final.

Nevertheless, in this period they failed to win the Greek Cup, even though they played in two Greek Cup finals. Rebrača, Gentile, Middleton, Alvertis, Kattash, Kutluay, and Fotsis were some of the team's players who excelled during these years. The dominance in the Greek League was finally interrupted in 2002, the year that PAO won their 3rd EuroLeague championship. Also, at the end of the year, there were many significant changes in the team, starting with the withdrawal of Bodiroga, making a renewal of the team's roster an imperative.

2002–03 was the year that Obradović used to restructure Panathinaikos, and return them to the top of Greece. He emphatically achieved this objective by leading the team to 9 straight Greek League championships (2003–11), with 6 doubles in Greece, and 2 triple crowns (i.e. Greek double plus EuroLeague champions) in the following years, thus creating a dynasty. Panathinaikos had radically changed the style of their game, after replacing Bodiroga. The game contribution of the Serbian player was replaced by an unprecedented model of teamwork, that proved that a superstar was unnecessary. Players such as Lakovič, Alvertis, Diamantidis, Fotsis, Tsartsaris, Batiste, and later Spanoulis, Šiškauskas, and Jasikevičius, who played not for themselves, but for the maximum success of the team, led to the transformation of PAO, into a title-winning machine, that was not hampered by irreplaceable players, and this quality was widely recognized.

At the 2007 EuroLeague Final Four, which was held on their home court of OAKA, in Athens, Panathinaikos became EuroLeague champions for the fourth time, after beating the defending champions at the time, CSKA Moscow, by a score of 93–91 in the final.

The same teams (PAO and CSKA), competed in the final of the 2009 EuroLeague Final Four in Berlin, where Panathinaikos won the trophy again, for the fifth time in their history. The score was 73–71. On 14 December 2009, Panathinaikos was voted the top Greek sports team of 2009, by the Greek Sports Journalists Association, with 1,291 votes. In addition, head coach Želimir Obradović, was voted the top coach, with 1,399 votes.

At the 2011 EuroLeague Final Four in Barcelona, Panathinaikos, after a great performance by Calathes in the semifinal against Montepaschi Siena (17 points, 6 rebounds, 2 steals), won 77–69, and reached the EuroLeague Final against Maccabi Tel Aviv. In the final, the "Great Club" won its sixth EuroLeague title, by holding off Maccabi, by a score of 78–70.

Post-Obradović period (2012–2018) 

After the departure of Obradović, Panathinaikos' new head coach, Argiris Pedoulakis, was forced to make massive changes to the team, with 12 new players being added to the roster, including James Gist, Roko Ukić, and NBA players Jason Kapono and Marcus Banks. Team captains Dimitris Diamantidis and Kostas Tsartsaris led the rebuilding effort for the Greens, who reached the EuroLeague quarterfinals, only to fall to FC Barcelona Regal in a 5-game series. Panathinaikos won their 14th Greek Cup, by beating Olympiacos in the final, with a three-point difference (81-78). During the same year, Panathinaikos was able to break Olympiacos' home court twice in the Greek League Finals, thus conquering the Greek League championship for the 33rd time in the club's history.

Since Dimitris Giannakopoulos first became the chairman of Panathinaikos, he repeatedly attempted to secure marketing deals with Asian corporations. The first step was made when Panathinaikos announced that they had signed Chinese basketball player Shang Ping. This deal made Panathinaikos the first European club to have a Chinese player on its roster. On 12 September 2013, Panathinaikos landed at the airport of Guangzhou, becoming the first European team to make a trip to China via airline. On 13 September 2013, Panathinaikos wrote European history once again, in less than two days, becoming the first European team to ever face a Chinese Basketball Association (CBA) team. In addition, Panathinaikos became the first European team to win against a Chinese team, the Foshan Dralions, with a score of 66–67.

On 8 March 2014, due to the fans' dissatisfaction with the team's bad record in the EuroLeague, the replacement of the team's head coach, Argiris Pedoulakis, was announced. It was also announced that the team would go to the Greek League Finals under the guidance of the club's legend, Fragiskos Alvertis, who would serve as an interim caretaker coach. After the conquest of another Greek double by beating Olympiacos, Panathinaikos announced the recruitment of Duško Ivanović, to be their new head coach.

On 5 April 2015, Panathinaikos beat Apollon Patras, in the final of the Greek Cup, with a score of 53–68. Earlier in the cup competition, the team had to overcome the obstacles of Olympiacos and PAOK. Panathinaikos made the EuroLeague playoffs. In Greek League, Panathinaikos lost to Olympiacos in the finals, 0–3.

On 30 June 2015, Sasha Đjorđjević was announced by the team, as the club's new head coach. Panathinaikos was able to sign Greek point guard Nick Calathes, and Serbian center Miroslav Raduljica. The debut of the team was dreamy, as on 8 October 2015, Panathinaikos beat and eliminated Olympiacos, in an away match for the Greek Basketball Cup, by a score of 64–70. On 6 March 2016, Panathinaikos won the Greek Cup for the 17th time in the club's history, and for the 5th straight season, with a record score of 101–52 against the Greek 2nd Division club, Faros Keratsiniou.

On 19 April 2016, Sasha Đjorđjević was replaced by Argyris Pedoulakis, who once again took over the team's head coaching position. Despite that, the team lost against Olympiacos in the finals of the Greek League, with a 1–3 series loss.

With the retirement of Dimitris Diamantidis, Panathinaikos turned over to a new page in the club's history. This led the team to increase its budget, and to obtain players such as Mike James, K.C. Rivers, Chris Singleton, and Ioannis Bourousis. Many sponsorship deals were also achieved at the same time, as well as the deal that made OPAP, Greece's biggest betting firm, the team's main sponsor. The appointment of Xavi Pascual as the team's head coach for three years, started a new era for the club.

The next two seasons, 2016/17 and 2017/18, Panathinaikos with coach Xavi Pascual managed to win two back-to-back Greek Basket League Championships against Olympiacos, and the 2017 Greek Basketball Cup against Aris.  They also made it to the EuroLeague playoffs, where they faced each year's upcoming champions (Fenerbahce in 2017, and Real Madrid in 2018) and eliminated from the EuroLeague Final Four both times. In the fifth Greek Basket League Championship final of 2017, Panathinaikos defeated Olympiacos in their home court, to win the Greek Championship after two years, winning the series with 3–2. The next year, Panathinaikos managed to be the only team in Europe to finish the regular season of their domestic championship undefeated. They remained undefeated until the finals, where they met Olympiacos again, and won the series once more with 3–2.

Despite the difficulties that followed Obradović's departure and the changes in the team's roster and the team's finances, Panathinaikos is the only team in Europe that manages to win at least one title every season, for 27 consecutive seasons, since 1996.

Rick Pitino era (2018–2020) 

After two and a half seasons, Panathinaikos parted ways with coach Xavi Pascual, on December 20, 2018. Pasqual paid the price for the teams' poor performance and losing streak in 2018/2019 EuroLeague. Georgios Vovoras served as Panathinaikos' interim head coach for the second time in his career, as the club agreed with Hall-Of-Famer Rick Pitino to be the team's new head coach, until the end of the 2018/2019 season. With coach Pitino on the bench, Panathinaikos transformed into a different team and managed to make an impressive comeback to the EuroLeague, finishing in the sixth place and getting into the playoffs. There, they faced once again the champions, Real Madrid, and eliminated from the EuroLeague Final Four. The season ended with Panathinaikos winning both the Greek Cup beating PAOK in the Cup Final, and the Greek Basket League Championship sweeping 3-0 Promitheas in the League Finals.

Panathinaikos made an offer to coach Pitino, and although he was willing to stay in Greece for the next season, a family matter occurred, so he had to return home. On June 24, 2019, Panathinaikos signed a two-year contract with Greek coach Argyris Pedoulakis once again, being the team's head coach for the third time in seven years. Pedoulakis's third stint ended on 15 November 2019, as Panathinaikos fired him once again, after team's poor performance on EuroLeague and elimination from the Greek Cup. Georgios Vovoras served as interim head coach for the third time.

On November 26, 2019, Rick Pitino typically and officially returned to Panathinaikos, after overcoming the family matter that kept him away from the benches, signing a one-and-a-half year contract, becoming team's head coach until the summer of 2021.
However, on 20 March 2020, Panathinaikos and Pitino have agreed to end their cooperation, in the face of the coronavirus pandemic that has forced the suspension of play in EuroLeague and Greek Basket League. Rick Pitino returned to his family in USA, as he also agreed to be the new head coach of Iona College. Once again, Georgios Vovoras served as interim head coach, for the fourth time.

Giannakopoulos step down & new team management (2020–present) 

In the summer of 2020, Panathinaikos went through major changes. On June 10, the owner of the team, Dimitris Giannakopoulos, held a press conference where he announced that he won't longer be involved with Panathinaikos, and that the club is up for sale for a price of 25 million euros. As a result of this, a new -and unusual- era began for the Greens, meaning that the team had to be rebuilt and operated based on the balance sheet, and that players with huge contracts couldn't stay with the club at the time. Many players had to leave the team, including long-time club captain Nick Calathes. Also long-time Panathinaikos member through different roles, Manos Papadopoulos, who was very close to the Giannakopoulos family for over 30 years, left the Greens to join Zenit Saint Petersburg as the club's sports director.

On June 26, 2020, Panathinaikos announced that the club's sport management will be represented by the team's legends and former players Dimitris Diamantidis and Fragiskos Alvertis, alongside former CEO Takis Triantopoulos. Meanwhile, George Vovoras was named head coach for the difficult upcoming season. After almost seven months, and due to the team's poor performance, Panathinaikos and coach Vovoras parted ways, on January 4, 2021. Kostas Charalampidis served as an interim coach for a few days, as of January 14, 2021, when Panathinaikos announced Oded Kattash as the club's new head coach, on a one-and-a-half year agreement. With coach Kattash, Panathinaikos managed to win both 2020–21 Greek Basket League and 2020–21 Greek Cup. However, on June 24, 2021, the team parted ways with him. Two days later, on June 26, 2021, Panathinaikos appointed Dimitris Priftis as their new head coach, on a three-year deal. Priftis has been no stranger to the team, as he had served as an assistant coach in 2014, under then head coach Fragiskos Alvertis.

On April 12, 2022, after a home defeat of a Greek Basket League regular season game against Olympiacos, in an unexpected turn of events, coach Priftis, general managers Diamantidis and Alvertis, and technical director Nikos Pappas were all fired by Panathinaikos, while president Panagiotis Triantopoulos resigned. Fragiskos Alvertis was given the option to stay in the club as team manager, but he declined the offer, leaving Panathinaikos for the first time in his life, after 32 long years with the club. Former Panathinaikos coach Argyris Pedoulakis was appointed immediately as the team's new technical director, having the responsibility for the team and the hiring of a new coach. On April 14, 2022, Panathinaikos announced the return of head coach George Vovoras for the remainder of the season, having former Lavrio B.C. head coach for 17 seasons Christos Serelis as an assistant. The reason for all those massive changes -according to the team's official press release- was the failure to "create a basic core of athletes and build a team for today and especially for tomorrow", as well as an economic failure, based on a balanced budget.

Players

Current roster

Depth chart

Retired numbers

Squad changes for the 2022–23 season

In

Out

Past rosters

Honours

Domestic competitions
 Greek League 
 Winners (39) (record): 1945–46, 1946–47, 1949–50, 1950–51, 1953–54, 1960–61, 1961–62, 1966–67, 1968–69, 1970–71, 1971–72, 1972–73, 1973–74, 1974–75, 1976–77, 1979–80, 1980–81, 1981–82, 1983–84, 1997–98, 1998–99, 1999–00, 2000–01, 2002–03, 2003–04, 2004–05, 2005–06, 2006–07, 2007–08, 2008–09, 2009–10, 2010–11, 2012–13, 2013–14, 2016–17, 2017–18, 2018–19, 2019–20, 2020–21
 Runners-up (12): 1952–53, 1967–68, 1969–70, 1977–78, 1982–83, 1992–93, 1994–95, 1995–96, 2011–12, 2014–15, 2015–16, 2021–22
 Greek Cup
 Winners (20) (record): 1978–79, 1981–82, 1982–83, 1985–86, 1992–93, 1995–96, 2002–03, 2004–05, 2005–06, 2006–07, 2007–08, 2008–09, 2011–12, 2012–13, 2013–14, 2014–15, 2015–16, 2016–17, 2018–19, 2020–21
 Runners-up (6): 1984–85, 1999–00, 2000–01, 2009–10, 2010–11, 2021–22
 Greek Super Cup
 Winners (1) : 2021

European competitions
 EuroLeague 
 Winners (6): 1995–96, 1999–00, 2001–02, 2006–07, 2008–09, 2010–11
 Runners-up (1): 2000–01
 Semifinalists (1): 1971–72
 3rd place (3): 1993–94, 1994–95, 2004–05
 4th place (1): 2011–12
 Final Four (11): 1994, 1995, 1996, 2000, 2001, 2002, 2005, 2007, 2009, 2011, 2012
 FIBA Saporta Cup (defunct)
 Semifinalists (2): 1968–69, 1997–98

Worldwide competitions
 FIBA Intercontinental Cup
 Winners (1): 1996

Other competitions
 FIBA International Christmas Tournament (defunct)
 Winners (1): 1999
 Athens, Greece Invitational Game 
 Winners (1): 2007
 Valjevo, Serbia Tournament
 Winners (1): 2008
 Gomelsky Cup
 Winners (1): 2009
 Runners-up (4): 2008, 2011, 2014, 2015
 Kruševac, Serbia Invitational Game
 Winners (1): 2009
 Užice, Serbia Invitational Game
 Winners (1): 2010
 Kragujevac, Serbia Invitational Game
 Winners (1): 2010
 Novi Sad, Serbia Invitational Game
 Winners (1): 2011
 Crete, Greece Invitational Game
 Winners (1): 2015
 Dimitris Diamantidis Tournament
 Winners (1): 2016
 Pavlos Giannakopoulos Tournament
 Winners (1): 2018
 Portaria-Makrinitsa, Greece Invitational Game
 Winners (1): 2018
 Vilnius, Lithuania Invitational Game
 Winners (1): 2020

Individual club awards
 Double 
 Winners (11) (record): 1981–82, 2002–03, 2004–05, 2005–06, 2006–07, 2007–08, 2008–09, 2012–13, 2013–14, 2016–17, 2018–19, 2020–2021
 Triple Crown
 Winners (2): 2006–07, 2008–09

Crest and colours
The trifolium is the emblem of the team; a symbol of harmony, unity, nature and good luck. The main colours of the team, since its foundation, are green and white (green for health and nature, such as physiolatry, and white for virtue). Alternative colours also used include black, lime, dark blue/purple uniforms, and elements of golden yellow.

Since 1992, the year in which the club's basketball department became professional, Panathinaikos B.C. uses its own logo.

Sponsors and Manufacturers
Since 1982, Panathinaikos has a specific kit manufacturer and a kit sponsor. The following tables detail the shirt sponsors and kit suppliers by year:

Current sponsorships
Great Shirt Sponsor: Pame Stoixima
Official Sport Clothing Manufacturer: Adidas
Official Sponsor: Altion, Protergia, Cosmote, Avance Car Rental, Coca-Cola 3E, EZA, Electroholic, Aktina, Viva, BP, HEDNO, Molto, Lenovo, Nikas, Nestle, Matrix, The Mall Athens, Pizza Fun, Indiba
Official Broadcaster: Cosmote TV
Official Partner: Smartup, Direction Business Network, Leoforos.gr
Official Health Care Service Provider: Hygeia Medical Center

Historical uniforms

Arena
Panathinaikos' long-time home court is the O.A.K.A., which is the largest indoor venue in Greece. It is located in Marousi, and is a part of the Athens Olympic Sports Complex. The venue was completed in 1995, and renovated for the 2004 Summer Olympics. It is considered to be one of the biggest and most modern indoor sports arenas in all of Europe. The seating capacity for basketball games is 18,989, however, the arena can hold up to a capacity of 20,000.

Supporters 
The team, which is famous for its fans' passionate support, also set a record (broken in 2009), for the highest home game attendance in the history of the EuroLeague, which was 20,000 fans, achieved at a home game in OAKA, against Benetton Treviso, on 29 March 2006, during the second phase of the 2005–06 EuroLeague.

An attendance of 18,900 fans has also been achieved three times in the EuroLeague, in home games of the Greens, against Efes Pilsen in 2005, and TAU Cerámica (twice) in 2006. While PAO no longer holds the record for largest EuroLeague home crowd, it still holds the honor of being involved in the record attendance game. PAO was the opponent of Partizan Belgrade, when it drew 22,567 fans to Belgrade Arena, during a 2008–09 EuroLeague game. The EuroLeague attendance record was then broken again by Panathinaikos, on 18 April 2013, on the season's 4th EuroLeague game (2012–13 EuroLeague) against FC Barcelona. It was estimated that the number of viewers reached 30,000 (over 25,000 officially). However, the EuroLeague does not officially recognize that as the all-time attendance record, since the number of fans in the arena, went over the arena's normal seating capacity.

Mascot

Mr. Green (2006-2021) 
"Mr. Green" was the first official mascot of Panathinaikos B.C. "Born" in 2006, he was a green muscular basketball player, with a basketball as a head. He used to wear a jersey with the number "08", which is a reference to 1908, the year Panathinaikos was founded. Creating Mr. Green took a good part of a month, since he was made out of material commonly being used in the Hollywood motion pictures industry for the construction of movie costumes, such as the ones for Batman, Spider-Man and other American movie characters. He entertained fans of all ages during game breaks, gave away presents, and participated in all entertainment events inside the court. Mr. Green partook in each and every game hosted by the team at OAKA, while he always stood by the children, participating in social responsibility events. He has also participated in five All Star Games.

Green Kong 
On 18 September 2021, during the 2021-22 pre-season and the beginning of the "3rd Pavlos Giannakopoulos tournament", "Green Kong", the new official mascot was revealed, a grey haired gorilla sporting a Panathinaikos jersey.

Rivalries

Olympiacos
Panathinaikos hold a major long-term rivalry with Olympiacos, and matches between the two teams are referred to as the "Derby of the eternal enemies". Panathinaikos is the most successful basketball club in Greece, with Olympiacos being runners-up. For the eternal enemies are the most traditional basketball powers, as they have been fighting in the top level of the Greek basketball scene longer than any other team.

Their rivalry is highly credited, especially in the 1990s-2000s, when they met each other in several regular season and playoff series, and in some EuroLeague matches which marked their history.

Minor rivalries
Panathinaikos used to hold a minor rivalry with Aris, mostly during the 1980s, when Panathinaikos and Aris were the two biggest dynasties in Greek basketball at the time. They also hold a minor rivalry with AEK and PAOK, not for on-court dominance but mostly due to the fanbase of the clubs involved. None of the above rivalries can even be compared to the huge and manifold rivalry with Olympiacos, though.

Seasons
Scroll down to see more.

Season by season

International record

The road to the six EuroLeague victories

EuroLeague 1996

EuroLeague 2000

EuroLeague 2002

EuroLeague 2007

EuroLeague 2009

EuroLeague 2011

Less significant European successes 
Panathinaikos has advanced to the Final Four of the EuroLeague (and its predecessor) another five times: Tel Aviv in 1994 (3rd), Zaragoza in 1995 (3rd), Paris in 2001 (2nd), Moscow in 2005 (3rd), and Istanbul in 2012 (4th). Other significant successes are: the two appearances in the semifinals of the FIBA Cup Winners' Cup (1968–69, 1997–98), as well as the road to the semifinals of the FIBA European Champions' Cup in the 1971–72 season (eliminated by Ignis Varese (78–70, 55–69). In the 1981–82 season, Panathinaikos participated in the semifinals of the FIBA European Champions' Cup, after eliminating the teams of CSKA Moscow and Levski-Spartak, in that order.

Friendly games against NBA and Chinese teams 
Panathinaikos has twice made a tour of the United States, for friendly games. In 2003, when they played against the NBA team the Toronto Raptors, and in 2007. On 11 October 2007, Panathinaikos played against the NBA's Houston Rockets, and on 18 October 2007, they played against the defending NBA champions at the time, the San Antonio Spurs.

Panathinaikos has also twice made a tour in China for friendly games. In 2013, when they played against Foshan Long Lions. On 28 September 2015, Panathinaikos played against Zhejiang Lions, and on 30 September 2015, they played against the Guangdong Tigers.

Season-by-season records

Notable players 

Listed as Green Legends in Panathinaikos B.C. site:

  Faidon Matthaiou (1949–1955)
  Giorgos Kolokithas (1966–1973)
  Takis Koroneos (1968–1986, 1989–1990)
   Chris Kefalos (1969–1978)
  Dimitris Kokolakis (1969–1983)
  Apostolos Kontos (1969–1983)
  Memos Ioannou (1974–1990)
   David Stergakos (1978–1991)
  Fragiskos Alvertis (1990–2009)
  Antonio Davis (1990–1992)
  Nikos Galis (1992–1994)
  Stojan Vranković (1992–1996)
  Dominique Wilkins (1995–1996)
  Panagiotis Giannakis (1994–1996)
  Dino Rađja (1997–1999)
  Byron Scott (1997–1998)
  Fanis Christodoulou (1997–1998)
  Antonis Fotsis (1997–2001, 2002–2003, 2008–2011, 2013–2017)
  Dejan Bodiroga (1998–2002)
  Željko Rebrača (1999–2001)
   Darryl Middleton (2000–2005)
  Oded Kattash (1999–2001)
  Mike Batiste (2003–2012, 2013–2014)
  Dimitris Diamantidis (2004–2016)
  Tony Delk (2006–2007)
  Sarunas Jasikevicius (2007–2010, 2011–2012)
  Nick Calathes (2009–2012, 2015–2020)
  James Gist (2012–2019)

Mentioned by Panathinaikos B.C. as players who have left their mark in basketball history:

Club captains 

  Apostolos Kontos (1972–1983)
  Takis Koroneos (1983–1985)
  Memos Ioannou (1985–1990)
  Liveris Andritsos (1990–1992)
  Nikos Galis (1992–1994)
  Panagiotis Giannakis (1994–1996)
  Nikos Oikonomou (1996–1997)
  Kostas Patavoukas (1997–1999)
  Fragiskos Alvertis (1999–2009)
  Dimitris Diamantidis (2009–2016)
  Nick Calathes (2016–2017)
  Ian Vougioukas (2017–2018)
  Nick Calathes (2018–2020)
  Ioannis Papapetrou (2020–2022)
  Georgios Papagiannis (2022–present)

Head coaches 

  Missas Pantazopoulos (1945–1951)
  Nikos Milas (1960–1961, 1963–1965, 1975–1976)
  Kostas Mourouzis (1966–1974, 1986–1987)
  Richard Dukeshire (1974–1975)
  Michalis Kyritsis (1978, 1983–1986, 1988–1989, 1997)
  Kostas Politis (1978–1982, 1993–1994)
  Željko Pavličević (1991–1993)
  Efthimis Kioumourtzoglou (1994–1995)
  Božidar Maljković (1995–1997)
   Slobodan Subotić (1997–1999)
  Željko Obradović (1999–2012)
  Argyris Pedoulakis (2012–2014, 2016, 2019)
  Duško Ivanović (2014–2015)
  Aleksandar Đorđević (2015–2016)
  Xavi Pascual (2016–2018)
  Rick Pitino (2018–2019, 2019–2020)
  Georgios Vovoras (2020–2021, 2022)
  Oded Kattash (2021)
  Dimitris Priftis (2021–2022)
  Dejan Radonjić (2022–2023)
  Christos Serelis (2023–present)

Honours and statistics

League records

Cup records

European records

Top 10 players in games, points, rebounds and assists in the A1 Division (since the 1986–87 season) 

Panathinaikos team leaders in games played, points scored, and rebounds, in games played in the Greek A1 Division, since it was first formed, starting with the 1986–87 season.
 * Still active player with the team.
:

One-club men

Individual honours

FIBA Hall of Fame
Nikos Galis
Naismith Memorial Basketball Hall of Fame 
Dominique Wilkins
Nikos Galis
Rick Pitino
Dino Rađja
FIBA's 50 Greatest Players 
Dino Rađja
Alexander Volkov
Giorgos Kolokithas
Nikos Galis
50 Greatest EuroLeague Contributors
Fragiskos Alvertis
Dejan Bodiroga
Nikos Galis
Panagiotis Giannakis
Šarūnas Jasikevičius
Božidar Maljković
Željko Obradović
Dino Rađja
EuroLeague Basketball Legend Award
Dimitris Diamantidis
Šarūnas Jasikevičius
Ramūnas Šiškauskas
EuroLeague Basketball 2001–10 All-Decade Team
Dejan Bodiroga 
Dimitris Diamantidis 
Šarūnas Jasikevičius 
Ramūnas Šiškauskas 
Mr. Europa 
Dimitris Diamantidis (2007)
All-Europe Player of the Year
Dejan Bodiroga (2002)
Dimitris Diamantidis (2007)
EuroLeague Executive of the Year
 Pavlos Giannakopoulos (2010–11)
 Thanasis Giannakopoulos (2010–11)

EuroLeague MVP
Dimitris Diamantidis (2010–11)
EuroLeague Final Four MVP
Dominique Wilkins (1995–96)
Željko Rebrača (1999–00)
Dejan Bodiroga (2001–02)
Dimitris Diamantidis (2006–07, 2010–11)
Vassilis Spanoulis (2008–09)
EuroLeague Best Defender
Dimitris Diamantidis (2004–05, 2005–06, 2006–07, 2007–08, 2008–09, 2010–11)
Stéphane Lasme (2012–13)
EuroLeague Top Scorer
 Nikos Galis (1993–94)
EuroLeague Coach of the Year Award
Željko Obradović (2006–07, 2010–11)
Greek Basket League MVP
Dejan Bodiroga (1998–99)
Željko Rebrača (1999–00)
Fragiskos Alvertis (2002–03)
Jaka Lakovič (2004–05)
Dimitris Diamantidis (2005–06, 2006–07, 2007–08, 2010–11, 2013–14)
Vassilis Spanoulis (2008–09)
Mike Batiste (2009–10)
Stéphane Lasme (2012–13)
Nick Calathes (2016–17, 2017–18, 2018–19)
Greek Basket League Finals MVP
Dino Rađja (1997–98)
Dejan Bodiroga (1998–99, 1999–00)
Željko Rebrača (2000–01)
Jaka Lakovič (2002–03, 2004–05)
Nikos Chatzivrettas (2003–04)
Dimitris Diamantidis (2005–06, 2006–07, 2007–08, 2008–09, 2013–14)
Mike Batiste (2009–10)
Stéphane Lasme (2012–13)
Greek Cup MVP
 Dominique Wilkins (1995–96)
 Željko Rebrača (1999–00)
 Fragiskos Alvertis (2002–03)
 Jaka Lakovič (2004–05)
 Kostas Tsartsaris (2005–06, 2006–07, 2007–08)
 Dimitris Diamantidis (2008–09, 2015–16)
 Šarūnas Jasikevičius (2011–12)
 Roko Ukić (2012–13)
 Ramel Curry (2013–14)
 Loukas Mavrokefalidis (2014–15)
 James Feldeine (2016–17)
 Nick Calathes (2018-19)

Greek League Top Scorer
Giorgos Kolokithas (1965–66, 1966–67)
Greek League Best Defender
Dimitris Diamantidis (2010–11)
Stéphane Lasme (2012–13, 2013–14)
Nick Calathes (2015-16, 2016-17, 2017-18)
Greek League Top Rebounder
 David Stergakos (1987–88)
 Antonio Davis (1991–92)
 Dino Rađja (1997–98)
Greek League Assist Leader
 Nikos Galis (1992–93, 1993–94)
 Byron Dinkins (1995–96)
 Dimitris Diamantidis (2005–06, 2006–07, 2009–10, 2010–11, 2014-15)
 Vassilis Spanoulis (2007–08)
Nick Calathes (2015-16, 2016-17, 2017-18)
Greek League Most Improved Player
Nick Calathes (2010–11)
Greek League Coach of the Year
Željko Obradović (2006–07, 2008–09, 2010–11)
Argyris Pedoulakis (2012–13)
Xavi Pascual (2016-17, 2017-18)
All-Greek League Team
 Kostas Tsartsaris (2003-04)
 Dimitris Diamantidis (2004-05, 2005-06, 2006-07, 2007-08, 2009-10, 2010-11, 2011-12, 2012-13, 2013-14, 2015-16)
 Jaka Lakovič (2004-05)
 Vassilis Spanoulis (2004-05, 2005-06, 2007-08, 2008-09)
 Ramūnas Šiškauskas (2006-07)
 Mike Batiste (2006-07, 2008-09, 2009-10, 2010-11, 2011-12)
 Šarūnas Jasikevičius (2008-09)
 Nikola Peković (2008-09)
 Drew Nicholas (2009-10)
 Stéphane Lasme (2012-13, 2013-14)
 Jonas Mačiulis (2013-14)
 Loukas Mavrokefalidis (2014-15)
 Nick Calathes (2016-17, 2017-18)
 Chris Singleton (2016-17, 2017-18)
Greek League Most Spectacular Player
 Mike James (2016-17)
 Thanasis Antetokounmpo (2017-18)
Greek League Best Young Player
 Antonis Fotsis (2000-01)

Management

Ownership & Current Board

|}

Academies staff

Presidential history

Until 1992, the President of Panathinaikos A.C. was responsible for the management of the team. In 1992, the basketball department became professional, with its own President.

See also
Panathinaikos women's basketball

References

External links

 
Panathinaikos B.C. at Euroleague.net
Panathinaikos B.C. at Eurobasket.com
Panathinaikos Arena
Academies official website
Official YouTube channel

 
Basketball
Basketball teams in Greece
Basketball teams established in 1919
EuroLeague-winning clubs
EuroLeague clubs
Sports clubs in Athens